Kim Do-yeon (born December 4, 1999), known mononymously as Doyeon, is a South Korean singer and actress signed under Fantagio. She is best known as a contestant on the Mnet reality show Produce 101, and being a member of resulted group I.O.I, and as a member of Weki Meki. In 2018, she appeared on Law of the Jungle and made her acting debut in the drama Short (2018).

Early life and education 
Kim Do-yeon was born on December 4, 1999. She attended Sangji Girls' High School where she was captain of the cheerleading team but eventually transferred to School of Performing Arts Seoul with fellow I.O.I and Weki Meki member Choi Yoo-jung after debuting as singers due to their promotional activities.

Career

2016–2017: Produce 101 and I.O.I

In January 2016, Kim participated in the Mnet reality-survival program Produce 101, which aimed to form an eleven-member girl group that would promote for a year under YMC Entertainment. She represented Fantagio along with Choi Yoo-jung and three other trainees from their company, eventually ranking eight in the show's finale on April 1, 2016. As a result, she debuted as a member of I.O.I alongside Choi. On May 4, 2016, I.O.I made their official debut with the single "Dream Girls".

2017–present: Weki Meki and WJMK

After the official disbandment of I.O.I on January 29, 2017, Choi and Kim traveled to the United States to film their reality show, Dodaeng's Diary in LA which aired on TVING. Doyeon was cast in the web series, Idol Fever. Doyeon made her debut as a member of Weki Meki on August 8, 2017, with the release of the single "I Don't Like Your Girlfriend" and the six-track EP Weme. Doyeon was featured in LONG:D's single, "All Night", released on December 14, 2017.

In February 2018, Kim made her acting debut after getting cast in a drama titled Short in which she played a supporting role. On May 2, 2018, Starship Entertainment and Fantagio collaborated to form a special four-member unit named WJMK, consisting of members of their respective girl groups Cosmic Girls and Weki Meki. Choi and Kim, together with Seola and Luda of Cosmic Girls, released the single "Strong" on June 1, 2018, along with its accompanying music video. Kim was part of the cast of Shoot-out Mart War alongside Cha Eun-woo, Park Soo-ah and many more. In July, Kim joined the cast of the SBS reality show Law of the Jungle in Last Indian Ocean. Doyeon made a cameo appearance on the JTBC romantic comedy drama, Be Melodramatic. Kim starred in the web drama Pop Out Boy! in 2020. The same year, she starred in Single and Ready to Mingle alongside Choi Yoo-jung.

On May 4, 2021, Kim Do-yeon and the members of I.O.I celebrated their 5th debut anniversary with a reunion live stream show called "Yes, I Love It!". The same year, Kim participated in the drama My Roommate Is a Gumiho which aired on tvN. Kim appeared in the tvN drama Jirisan as the teenager version of Jun Ji-hyun's character. Kim also appeared in the SBS drama One the Woman as the younger counterpart of Honey Lee.

On March 1, 2022, Doyeon, chosen by global makeup brand Bobbi Brown, launched a new campaign 'The Radiant Power Fair' in partnership with Lachika's Shimizu.

Discography

Singles

Filmography

Television series

Web series

Television shows

Web shows

Videography

Music videos

Notes

References

External links

 Kim Do-yeon at Fantagio
 

Living people
1999 births
21st-century South Korean women singers
Fantagio artists
21st-century South Korean singers
21st-century South Korean actresses
I.O.I members
Musicians from Incheon
Produce 101 contestants
School of Performing Arts Seoul alumni
South Korean female idols
South Korean women pop singers
South Korean web series actresses
Swing Entertainment artists
Weki Meki